Chasco is a surname. Notable people with the surname include:

Javier Murguialday Chasco (born 1962), Spanish road bicycle racer
Sergio Gámiz Chasco (born 1978), Spanish footballer

See also
 Chasco Middle School